Auratonota auriginea is a species of moth of the family Tortricidae. It is found in Brazil.

The wingspan is 14–18 mm. The ground colour of the forewings is golden yellow, in some parts creamer near the marking edges and darkening internally. The markings are darker than the ground colour. The hindwings are cream, in the distal part tinged with ochreous, strongly suffused with brownish or almost entirely brownish.

References

Moths described in 2000
Auratonota
Moths of South America